Group D of the 2018 FIFA World Cup took place from 16 to 26 June 2018. The group consisted of Argentina, Iceland, Croatia, and Nigeria. The top two teams, Croatia and Argentina, advanced to the round of 16.

Teams

Notes

Standings

In the round of 16:
 The winners of Group D, Croatia, advanced to play the runners-up of Group C, Denmark.
 The runners-up of Group D, Argentina, advanced to play the winners of Group C, France.

Matches
All times listed are local time.

Argentina vs Iceland

The two teams had never met before.

Despite stamping their authority on the game's opening stages, Argentina struggled to find space against the Icelandic defence. Argentina then scored in the 19th minute, Sergio Agüero scoring with a powerful left foot shot to the top left corner of the net giving them a 1–0 lead. Alfreð Finnbogason made history by scoring his country's first World Cup goal just four minutes later when he slotted to the net from six yards out after the ball broke to him from six yards out. Argentina then had the chance to go ahead again when Hörður Björgvin Magnússon pushed Maximiliano Meza inside the box after 64 minutes. Hannes Þór Halldórsson dove to his right to deny Lionel Messi a goal. Although Argentina continued to press for a goal, but they were repeatedly denied by the Nordics' defense.

Argentina failed to win their opening match at a World Cup tournament for the first time since losing to Cameroon in 1990, and it was the first time that they drew their opener in the competition. Argentina have missed their last two penalties taken at a World Cup finals (excluding shootouts), with Ariel Ortega failing to convert against Sweden in 2002 before Messi's effort against Iceland in 2018. The Iceland forward's goal after 23 minutes was the earliest scored for a nation playing in their first World Cup match since Rashidi Yekini netted after 21 minutes for Nigeria against Bulgaria on 21 June 1994.

Croatia vs Nigeria
The two teams had never met before.

Ivan Perišić went closest to hitting the target with an effort from 20 metres after a quarter of an hour, but in the end it was Nigeria's Oghenekaro Etebo who brought joy to the huge Croatian contingent in Kaliningrad, beating his own goalkeeper with the ball going into the left corner of the net following a Luka Modrić corner from the right which had been deflected off Perišić and Mario Mandžukić. Alex Iwobi, after wriggling into space on the left side of the box, he hit a shot directly into a Croatia defender. Ante Rebić fired over from Perišić's left-wing centre, with Odion Ighalo's header recording the match's first shot on target in the 59th minute. William Troost-Ekong was penalised for holding Mandžukić in the penalty area, and Modrić sent Francis Uzoho the wrong way from 12 yards for his first World Cup goal, shooting low to the left corner.

Croatia have won their opening game of a World Cup for the first time since their debut in the competition in 1998 (3–1 vs Jamaica). Nigeria became the first team in World Cup history to concede two consecutive own goals in the competition, with their last goal shipped in 2014, against France in the last 16, also coming in this manner.

Argentina vs Croatia
The two teams had met in four matches, including one game at the 1998 FIFA World Cup, an Argentina 1–0 victory.

Ivan Perišić surged into space down the left and shot towards the bottom-right corner, which was tipped around the post by Willy Caballero. A Dejan Lovren block prevented Maximiliano Meza's low strike finding the net and then Marcos Acuña's cross clipped the top of Danijel Subašić's crossbar. Enzo Pérez struck wide from 15 yards. Three minutes later, Mario Mandžukić flashed a header wide of Caballero's right-hand post from six yards. Eight minutes into the second half, Ante Rebić shot a right foot volley past Caballero after the goalkeeper's mishit an attempted chip over his head. Subašić kept out Meza's close-range effort from substitute Gonzalo Higuaín's cutback. With ten minutes remaining Luka Modrić curled in from 20 yards with his right foot to the right corner of the net to score Croatia's second. Ivan Rakitić was fouled by Javier Mascherano – Nicolás Otamendi receiving a booking for appearing to kick the ball towards Rakitić's head as tempers flared – and crashed the resulting free-kick against the crossbar. Rakitić in the 91st minute, though, slotted home from the centre of the box after his initial shot deflected off Caballero and found Mateo Kovačić who passed it back to Rakitić from the left. With their second win in a row, Croatia advanced to the round of 16 for the first time since 1998, having been eliminated in 2002, 2006 and 2014 editions.

This was Croatia's first victory in five attempts against a South American team at the World Cup, having lost the previous four. This was Argentina's heaviest defeat in the first-round group stage of a World Cup since losing 6–1 to Czechoslovakia in 1958. Argentina failed to win either of their opening two group stage matches for the first time since 1974.

Nigeria vs Iceland

The two teams had met only once, in a friendly game in 1981, won by Iceland 3–0.

Gylfi Sigurðsson shot a sixth-minute chance straight at Francis Uzoho. In the last minute of the first half, Alfreð Finnbogason was unable to get a decisive touch on Sigurðsson's free-kick delivered from the right wing. In the 49th minute, Victor Moses' cross was collected by Ahmed Musa, who first controlled it in the air with his right foot before scoring on the half-volley powerfully to the net. Hannes Þór Halldórsson tipped over a deflected drive from Wilfred Ndidi. In the 75th minute, fed by Kenneth Omeruo, Musa burst clear in the left channel, cut inside and rounded Halldórsson before scoring with his right foot. A late VAR review spotted that substitute Tyronne Ebuehi had tripped Finnbogason, with Sigurðsson's spot-kick effort clearing the crossbar.

Iceland are the third World Cup debutants from Europe to have faced Nigeria at the tournament, and on every occasion Nigeria have emerged victorious, following victories against Greece (2–0) in 1994 and Bosnia and Herzegovina (1–0) in 2014. Uzoho is the second youngest goalkeeper to keep a clean sheet in a World Cup match (19 years, 237 days), behind only Li Chan-myung in North Korea's 1–0 win over Italy in July 1966 (19 years, 198 days). This is Nigeria's first victory in a World Cup game by a margin of more than one goal since they beat Greece 2–0 in 1994 at their first World Cup tournament. This was Iceland's first group stage's defeat in any big tournament.

Nigeria vs Argentina
The two teams had met in eight matches, including four games at FIFA World Cup group stages, in 1994, 2002, 2010 and 2014, all won by Argentina.

Ahmed Musa narrowly cleared the crossbar in the early minutes of the game. In the 14th minute, Lionel Messi controlled the ball from a pass over the top from Éver Banega on his thigh and his left boot before shooting a right-footed drive past Francis Uzoho from the right. Leon Balogun brought Ángel Di María down 25 yards from goal, but Uzoho tipped Messi's free kick to his left-hand post. In the second half, Leon Balogun was held in the penalty area by Javier Mascherano after a corner form the left, and Victor Moses scored from the resulting penalty to equalize for Nigeria, shooting low to the right with the goalkeeper diving the other way. After Oghenekaro Etebo narrowly missed from a long-range free kick, Gabriel Mercado raided down the right and bent a cross into the penalty area, with Marcos Rojo, who scored the decisive goal against Nigeria four years ago in Brazil, once again converting, as he tucked home a low right-footed volley to give Argentina the win and see them advance to the knockout stage.

Messi's strike brought up the century for goals at Russia 2018. He also joined Diego Maradona and Gabriel Batistuta in becoming the third Argentina player to score in three World Cups.

Iceland vs Croatia
The two teams had met in six matches, most recently in 2017 for the 2018 FIFA World Cup qualification, which ended in a 1–0 Iceland victory.

Hörður Magnússon headed wide from Jóhann Guðmundsson's outswinging corner. Alfreð Finnbogason shot wide from the edge of the area. Birkir Bjarnason pounced from a corner, but Lovre Kalinić made a save from Aron Gunnarsson's curling effort. At the restart, Milan Badelj's strike clattered off the crossbar. Badelj got his goal when he reacted to a loose ball in the Iceland box and hammered home from close range. Sverrir Ingason's header rebounded back off the bar. Dejan Lovren's handball though enabled Gylfi Sigurðsson to score from the spot in the 76th minute. Badelj provided a throughball and, having outpaced his marker, Ivan Perišić lashed home to score the winner.

Croatia topped a world finals group for the first time in their history, and because of Croatia's victory, Argentina also qualified. With the defeat, Iceland stood bottom in the group with a single point and were eliminated.

Discipline
Fair play points would have been used as tiebreakers if the overall and head-to-head records of teams were tied. These were calculated based on yellow and red cards received in all group matches as follows:
first yellow card: minus 1 point;
indirect red card (second yellow card): minus 3 points;
direct red card: minus 4 points;
yellow card and direct red card: minus 5 points;

Only one of the above deductions were applied to a player in a single match.

References

External links

 2018 FIFA World Cup Group D, FIFA.com

2018 FIFA World Cup
Argentina at the 2018 FIFA World Cup
Iceland at the 2018 FIFA World Cup
Croatia at the 2018 FIFA World Cup
Nigeria at the 2018 FIFA World Cup